Steve Corkin (born 3 November 1963) is a New Zealand judoka. He competed at the 1992 Summer Olympics and the 1996 Summer Olympics.

References

External links
 

1963 births
Living people
New Zealand male judoka
Olympic judoka of New Zealand
Judoka at the 1992 Summer Olympics
Judoka at the 1996 Summer Olympics
Sportspeople from New Plymouth